Béla Melis (born 25 September 1959) is a retired Hungarian football striker. He was a squad member for the 1979 FIFA World Youth Championship and became Nemzeti Bajnokság I top goalscorer in 1987–88.

References

1959 births
Living people
Hungarian footballers
Budapest Honvéd FC players
Békéscsabai Előre NKSE players
Győri ETO FC players
Debreceni VSC players
Vasas SC players
Nemzeti Bajnokság I players
Association football forwards
Hungary youth international footballers
People from Békéscsaba
Sportspeople from Békés County
20th-century Hungarian people